The Earl Shilton Building Society is a UK building society, which has its head office in Earl Shilton, Leicestershire. It is the 53rd largest in the United Kingdom based on total assets of £96.1 million as at 31 March 2008. It is a member of the Building Societies Association.

References

External links
Earl Shilton Building Society
Building Societies Association
 KPMG Building Societies Database 2008

Building societies of England
Banks established in 1857
Organizations established in 1857
Organisations based in Leicestershire
1857 establishments in England